"Better" is a song performed by German singers Lena Meyer-Landrut and Nico Santos. The song was released as a digital download on 16 August 2019 by Universal Music Group. The song peaked at number 15 on the German Singles Chart. The song also charted in Austria and Switzerland.

Background
The song is about relationships, about how a couple thought they were for each other but it was not meant to be. They sing how their love for each other was not enough and how they wish each other well and how they will not find someone else better.

Music video
A music video to accompany the release of "Better" was first released onto YouTube on 30 August 2019.

Charts

Weekly charts

Year-end charts

Certifications

Release history

References

2019 singles
2019 songs
Lena Meyer-Landrut songs
Songs written by Lena Meyer-Landrut